Nikos Xylouris (7 July 1936 – 8 February 1980), Cretan nickname: Psaronikos, was a Greek singer, Cretan Lyra player and composer, who was and remains to this day among the most renowned and beloved Greek folk musicians of all time.  Xylouris' outstanding vocal ability and diverse discographic repertoire, which encompassed both rural traditional and urban orchestral music, managed to capture the essence of the Greek psyche, ethos and demeanor, rendering him extremely popular among the youth of his day, and making his work an essential part of the Great Greek Songbook.  His remarkable artistic charisma, his appealing physical features (which were also reminiscent of Byzantine Iconography) and his enormous personal affability ("noble in both countenance and decorum" as per the Ancient Greek Ideal) along with an onstage presence that Greek urban audiences deemed majestic, inspiring and dignified earned him the honorific moniker Archangel of Crete which he is known by all across Greece, and especially in Athens.  His songs continue to be played regularly on Greek radio stations, his contribution is universally recognized among his fellow musicians, and his legacy is held in the highest regard throughout the Greek Nation and the Greek Diaspora alike.

Origins and Background
Nikos Xylouris was born in Anogeia, Mylopotamos Province, Rethymno Prefecture, a village perched on the slopes of Mount Ida, (aka Psiloritis, literally: "high mountain") the highest mountain on the island of Crete, itself the largest of all the Greek Islands, situated at the southernmost end of the Aegean Sea.  He was born to a family and community of herdsmen and farmers, who much like other Greek Islanders, were very well versed in Greek traditional music, with many locals adept at playing multiple folk musical instruments, either as amateurs or in a semi-professional and fully professional capacity.  The village of Anogeia has produced several musicians who rose to island-wide and later nation-wide prominence over the years, and as pertains to affairs of culture it continues to exert significant influence.  Xylouris was the fourth child and first son of Giorgis Xylouris and his wife Eleftheria, and was born after sisters Elli, Zoumboulia and Euridice.  His two male siblings who followed in order of birth, Antonis Xylouris or Psarantonis and Giannis Xylouris or Psarogiannis are accomplished and celebrated figures of Cretan music in their own right, and members of their extended family continue to walk in the same footsteps.

Xylouris' nickname "Psaronikos" (the prefix "Psaro" meaning "Fish/Fish-like", plus his given name Niko[lao]s) is derived and inherited from his grandfather Antonis, who during one of the many instances of the Cretan Struggle for Liberation and Independence from Ottoman Rule displayed great valor, and was said to "consume the Turks as if they were fish", in an account provided by Xylouris himself, and reiterated by his brother Giannis.  The nickname was passed down along the male line of the family, with each person's given name substituting the inaugural one respectively, and the prefix remaining intact. In a slightly different origin story, it was said that Antonis kept company with a group of Cretans who exercised guerilla warfare tactics against the Turks, with deliberate dispersal and reunification at predetermined locations after brief engagements and skirmishes.  Antonis would "catch up to the rest of them as if they were a school of fish that broke up and then coalesced again; they were as slippery as fish, in waters they knew all too well, and thus impossible to apprehend", Antonis himself being the most nimble, and frustrating the Turks who could never capture him.  Or, in yet another variation, quick enough to strike at two distant target locations in a single day, and both times disappear as quickly and efficiently as fish vanish in the sea.  The use of such nicknames, bestowed for specific traits or actions, is prevalent throughout the Greek countryside, and its familial aspect is often retained on purpose, so as to distinguish between clans, branches, or unrelated families with identical surnames.  Conversely, some nicknames may be unique to specific individuals, and may reflect a notable incident of their lives which warrants extraordinary praise, attention, recognition, or, alternately, condemnation.

When Xylouris was age eight, and with World War II battles still raging, the Nazis razed Anogeia to the ground in reprisal for acts of Cretan Resistance against the Axis Occupation, as well as the great number of casualties the Germans had sustained during their initial assault on Crete some three years prior, when German paratroopers, descended upon the island, only to be decimated by the locals.  The mayor and citizens of Anogeia would support and harbor Special Operations Executive (SOE) agents and Cretan Resistance fighters in their village.  In addition, under the direction of Captain William Stanley Moss, Cretans ambushed a detachment of German soldiers which had received orders to attack Anogeia. The legendary SOE operative Captain Patrick Leigh Fermor had also been ensconced in Anogeia during the kidnapping of Heinrich Kreipe in May 1944, but escaped with his band of Cretan partisans when the German forces approached.  Such acts of defiance caused Germans to target specific villages and retaliate against them, sometimes regardless of direct villager involvement.  The razing of Kandanos and the Viannos massacres were similar instances of Nazi atrocities committed in Crete.  In the aftermath of the devastation, Xylouris family members, along with the rest of the inhabitants of Anogeia, were forced to flee to other villages of the Mylopotamos region, and in some cases found refuge in major cities until the Liberation of Crete, which came after the Allied Advance and the German Surrender.  Nearly a full year after the razing, the area was surveyed and the extent of the damage that had been inflicted upon Anogeia was documented by a scientific committee which was officially appointed by the newly restored Greek government.  Its members included famous Cretan writer Nikos Kazantzakis and celebrated University Professor Ioannis Kakridis, who are both remembered for their joint translation of the works of Homer, among other literary endeavors.  Upon their return to Anogeia, citizens had to rebuild their homes and town from scratch, and the harshness of the undertaking imbued them with a sense of purpose, dedication, self-reliance, solidarity and pride.  Due to the fact that village archives had perished in the flames, some ambiguity still exists as to the exact birth dates of all persons who had yet to produce additional official documentation, such as marriage and/or military service certificates, Xylouris included.  This is the reason why certain sources may offer conflicting birth dates, although the one mentioned herein is considered to be the most probable and accurate by consensus.  Archives were recreated based on village elder and relative testimony, to the best of the inhabitants' ability.  The unique cultural climate of Crete left lasting impressions to all Allied personnel who had served there.  In the years following the war, Patrick Leigh Fermor so often sang what would later become one of Xylouris' most popular hits, the song Filedem (Greek: Φιλεντέμ) that his friends attached it to him permanently as a sobriquet reminiscent of his war years.

Early life and career in Crete
At a very young age, Xylouris discovered his artistic inclination (all three male siblings learned the basics of how to play the mandolin and other folk musical instruments alongside their friends at village feasts and peer gatherings) and besought his father Giorgis to purchase him a Cretan Lyra, (the three-stringed or four-stringed Cretan fiddle analogue, which is played held upright, usually supported on the knee), a significant investment at the time.  Giorgis resented the notion of his elder son becoming a musician, which was deemed somewhat menial and rather disreputable as a full-time occupation, and preferred that he attain higher education instead, which would enable him to improve the overall outlook of his life, and escape the dire circumstances of poverty and hardship that plagued his fellow villagers.  Thus, Giorgis fiercely opposed his son's demand at first.  However, between the boy's entreaties and the exhortations of local school teacher Menelaos Dramountanis who had identified Xylouris' enormous potential and considered his singing voice to be a decisive asset, Giorgis acquiesced and Xylouris acquired his first instrument at the age of twelve.  After an apprenticeship under the tutelage of the experienced lyra player Leonidas Klados, Xylouris started performing at social functions and local festivities throughout the region and later across the island, usually accompanied by his younger brother Giannis who played the lute.  In those events, gifted musicians were being generously rewarded, and not just by one sole organizing party, but by all participants to the celebration who, if affluent enough, as per custom, would present the orchestra with banknotes for every single song or dancing tune they requested be played.  Musicians' reputations grew by crowd acclaim and word of mouth, once they were proven able to please, stir and entertain their audience for the duration of the event, which could sometimes last for days on end.  Having earned a good reputation as a skilled and sought-after musician, and aspiring to become a widely recognized professional with full financial independence, at age seventeen Xylouris again surprised his parents when he decided to move from his native Anogeia to Heraklion, the largest city in Crete, where he would soon make nightly appearances at the venue "Kastron" (Greek: Κάστρον, literally meaning Castle, which invoked the city's Medieval name).  At first, little was gained in terms of headway, and making ends meet in the city was challenging.  The audience, mostly urban and somewhat upper class, had moved away from Cretan traditional music, Xylouris' own turf, and had become much more accustomed to European rhythms and tunes, looking down upon the "old people's music" of their rural contemporaries and counterparts.  In such an environment, all folk musicians struggled to adapt and survive financially, not least due to their utter lack of multilingual term familiarity, which foreign lyrics seemed to necessitate.  Furthermore, city musicians were distrustful of newcomers and unwilling to yield them any professional breathing space.  By his own account, Xylouris was reluctant to admit to his father that he was facing great hardships during that time, and instead assured him to the contrary.  Gradually, he developed a personal following, found a firm foothold, and carved out a niche for himself.  His friends and admirers not only provided encouragement, but organized gatherings for him to play music at, earn a living from, and attract additional support by.  In 1967 he helped establish in Heraklion the first exclusively Cretan folk music hall, which was named Erotokritos in honor of the great poetic work of the same name.  This venue would cater to the needs of rural Cretans who were visiting the city either for business or on social grounds, and sought a kind of entertainment they were familiar and comfortable with during their sojourn.  Such denizens would bring their entire families in tow, and would also convince their urban acquaintances to tag along.  As a consequence, Cretan folk music, which for all intents and purposes was moribund in the city, experienced a revival.  In the course of time, Xylouris not only found acceptance as a musician in Heraklion, but he was also able to turn his demanding urban audience around, causing them to rediscover, appreciate and preserve Cretan folk music for future generations.  It was the first major goal he had set out to accomplish, the second one being to make that music known well beyond the confines of his native island.  With his transition to Athens a few years later, he would captivate the Greek national audience in its entirety and, alongside other famous musicians from Crete, he would proceed to introduce Cretan traditional music to every Greek household.  Therefore, today he is at least partially credited with achieving both.

Xylouris' first foray into studio recordings came in 1958 by means of a vinyl single in 7-inch 45rpm format which carried the songs "Mia mavrofora otan perna" (When a woman clad in all black passes by | Greek: Μια μαυροφόρα όταν περνά) on the obverse and "Den klaine oi dynates kardies" (Strong hearts don't cry | Greek: Δεν κλαίνε οι δυνατές καρδιές) on the reverse.  The recording very nearly did not materialize.  Although Odeon Records, the company Xylouris, his brother Giannis and their cousin Zacharias Fasoulas had approached to make their pitch, followed standard procedure and granted them an audition, the executives were worried that Cretan music lacked commercial potential at that time, and therefore initially rejected the idea of going forward with the release of a single.  Upon hearing of the company's decision, Greek MP from Crete Pavlos Vardinogiannis, who provided Xylouris lodging during his visit to the label's corporate headquarters and was fond of Cretan musical tradition, intervened not only vouching for Xylouris as a musician, but promising to fully reimburse Odeon for every unit that remained unsold, should the project fail to meet their expectations.  Odeon relented, and the recording took place with Xylouris' wife Ourania providing supporting vocals for her husband at the studio.  The single was a major success, completely vindicating Vardinogiannis and his judgment.  Other singles would follow with Odeon, but its executives remained ambivalent as to the marketability of both Xylouris as an artist and Cretan music as a genre.  Much later, when Columbia, their main competitor, signed Xylouris and his popularity exploded, Odeon having realized their mistake, tried to lure him out of his new contract and back into their ranks with a very lucrative counteroffer.  However, being a person who as a matter of principle placed honor and loyalty before profits and self-advancement, Xylouris politely turned them down.  When Columbia leadership found out about their rivals' failed bid, they decided to improve the financial terms of Xylouris' contract of their own accord, without him ever having requested a renegotiation.

The turning point in his career came in 1969, with the release of another famed vinyl single, also in 7-inch 45rpm format, this time under the Columbia label, which carried the songs "Anyfantou" (Weaver | Greek: Ανυφαντού) on the obverse and "Kavgades me to giasemi" (Quarrels with the jasmine | Greek: Καβγάδες με το γιασεμί) on the reverse.  The single was a resounding success, and the public's enthusiastic response meant that prior reservations concerning the appeal of Cretan folk music were mostly unfounded, a fact which was not lost on company executives.  Xylouris had caught the eye of the top brass, and his future looked brighter than ever.  Shortly thereafter, he began making appearances in Athens, which would eventually become his new home.  Nevertheless, in spite of Anyfantou's soaring popularity, not all parties involved in folk music were enthralled.  When, at the behest of his brother Giannis and Zacharias Fasoulas, who both accompanied him with their lutes and were his permanent associates, Xylouris met with the highly controversial musicologist and Director for Folk Music Programming at the Greek National Radio Simon Karas, the latter derided Anyfantou and questioned Xylouris' ability to properly render traditional songs that were core to his repertoire, an opinion which none of the major composers and conductors Xylouris would later work with shared, but which left him understandably shocked and dismayed at the time.  Ultimately, the Greek National Radio would come around to embrace Anyfantou, by featuring the song in one of its special commemorative broadcasts.

Later life and career in Athens
Regarding his artistic discovery by the musical establishment of Athens, two views have been put forward, which are not necessarily mutually exclusive.  According to the most widely reproduced narrative, his next career steps came as a product of early appearances in Athens at the Konaki Cretan Folk Music Hall.  In what remains standard practice to this day, musicians who distinguish themselves in Crete are invited to perform for Cretans who permanently reside in the Capital, and to a lesser extent other major cities.  During such a stint, Xylouris met film director and screenwriter Errikos Thalassinos, himself also of Cretan descent, who became one of his dearest friends, and went on to introduce him to composer Yannis Markopoulos, who had previously written film score for some of Thalassinos' projects.  Markopoulos and Xylouris initiated a fruitful collaboration that spanned the better part of a decade.  However, as attested to by Xylouris' wife Ourania, it was Takis Lambropoulos, the head of Columbia Records Greece who had first spotted Xylouris when he was singing at a wedding reception in Crete, was moved by his voice, and made an impromptu live recording of him with his tape recorder.  Lambropoulos then sent the tape to composer Stavros Xarchakos, who was living in Paris at the time, to make him aware of his find.  More than a business associate, Xarchakos would become a bosom friend to Xylouris and his family.  This version is bolstered by concurrent reports in the Athenian Press that Lambropoulos had found "a major new vocal talent" in Crete, as well as the in-law-type bond formed between him and Xylouris (Greek: κουμπαριά) which Lambropoulos would pride himself on.  Xarchakos and Xylouris also had a prolific collaboration, which extended into the theater.

Eventually, Xylouris would work with additional composers and conductors, such as Christodoulos Chalaris, Christos Leontis and Linos Kokotos.  The net result of those multiple collaborations was an impressive array of poetry sung by Xylouris which included works written by the likes of Nikos Gatsos, Yannis Ritsos, Giorgos Seferis, Kostas Varnalis, Dionysios Solomos, Vitsentzos Kornaros, Kostas Karyotakis, Rigas Feraios, Kostas Kindynis and Kostas Georgousopoulos (aka Kostas Myris).  This fact secured Xylouris another unofficial, yet highly coveted distinction: that of the Singer of the Poets.

Xylouris relocated to Athens during the Greek military junta of 1967–1974, which had come to power after a successful coup d'état.  At that time, entertainment which was not commissioned and/or bankrolled directly by the regime, censorship notwithstanding, offered a welcome respite from its oppressive nature.  Especially youthful audiences made up of university students, manual laborers and various employees flocked to establishments operating around the Acropolis, where Xylouris and other popular singers of the era would perform on a regular basis.  Cretan traditional songs that were previously meant to foster the spirit of revolution against the Ottomans and sustain the hope for Cretan liberation were being repurposed to voice opposition against the Junta and express the longing for its demise.  Xylouris realized how empowering those songs were for students who were rebelling against the dictatorship, and stood by their side during the Athens Polytechnic School Uprising of 1973, entering the premises of the institution and singing songs that were banned by the Junta, along with Stavros Xarchakos, with both men's photographs appearing in the press the following days.  Xylouris became as much a thorn in the side of the Greek military junta and its leadership as he was a beacon of hope to the Greek people.  His songs were banned from radio and television, and he was also summoned to the Military Police Headquarters, but was not displaced to islands of exile nor tortured as were others.  Venues that he appeard in were nonetheless surveilled by operatives of the regime.  As a result, his voice became identified not only with Cretan and modern music, but with the very movement to restore Democracy, much like the voice of Sofia Vembo had galvanized the Greek populace during the Second World War. Composers of the era were attempting to find new routes in music, by blending traditional sounds and instruments with orchestral arrangemets and novel poetic works.  The genre of music that emerged out of those efforts was uplifting and inspiring to the Greeks, who were in need of a distinct cultural environment than the one the Junta was willing to offer.  At the same time, around the year 1971, Greek intellectuals sought to convey anti-dictatorial messages with the opportunity of the 150th Anniversary of the Greek Revolution of 1821, while the Junta aimed to exploit the same occasion for pro-regime propaganda and abundant spectacle.  The theater company of Tzeni Karezi and Kostas Kazakos commissioned renowned playwright Iakovos Kambanellis, a survivor of Nazi extermination camps and later member of the Academy of Athens, to pen a retrospective of modern Greek history, from Independence onwards, scored by Xarchakos, who in turn offered Xylouris the part of the main singer.  An initially nervous and hesitant Xylouris was reassured and convinced by Xarchakos to get on board, and the result was the legendary play staged at the Athinaion Theater, opposite the Athens Polytechnic School, under the title "To Megalo Mas Tsirko" (Our Great Circus | Greek: Το Μεγάλο μας Τσίρκο) which enjoyed unprecedented success.  Several slogans that were used in the play, such as Psomi - Paideia - Eleftheria (Bread - Education - Freedom | Greek: Ψωμί - Παιδεία - Ελευθερία) and Foni Laou - Orgi Theou (People's Cry - God's Wrath | Greek: Φωνή Λαού - Οργή Θεού) were quickly adopted by protesting university students, became inextricably linked with the events surrounding their uprising, and found their way into the Greek Nation's collective consciousness after the restoration of Democratic rule which came in 1974.  The spirit of that era has been kept alive in student protests ever since, and continues to be invoked up until the present day.

Following the restoration of Democracy, Xylouris would go on to release additional albums with Markopoulos and Xarchakos.  At the same time, he continued to make live appearances and concerts.  In the days immediately after the fall of the Junta, he was one of the many musicians who participated in the great liberation concert immortalized as Tragoudia tis Fotias (Songs of Fire | Greek: Τραγούδια της Φωτιάς) by director Nikos Koundouros, exactly as they were sung before the Athenian audience.  The remainder of the decade would bring great success to Xylouris and further cement his legacy.

Public and critical acclaim
In 1966 Xylouris was selected to represent Greece at the Sanremo Music Festival and won First Prize in its Folk Music Section.  In 1971 he was awarded the Grand Prix du Disque by the Académie Charles-Cros in France for his performance of the Cretan Rizitika album with Yannis Markopoulos.

Personal life and family
Xylouris met his wife Ourania Melampianakis at a festival in her native village of Venerato, nearby Heraklion, where he was called to perform.  The pair only exchanged glances from afar, the local flirtship customs and norms being extremely austere, much more so in their case due to a considerable difference in social status.  Ourania was the offspring of an affluent family, while Xylouris was seen as little more than an itinerant musician.  Although Cretan society did not enforce strict class segregation per se, pairings that were viewed as socially unequal were frowned upon, and public opinion was certain to object to the prospect of such a union.  In the following months, Xylouris would nonetheless serenade Ourania regularly (perform a "Cantada" in the local vernacular), a custom almost all medievally Italian-occupied areas of Greece share (the Ionian Islands being another prime example of the same practice) and which many male youths of Crete would often perform to woo the young ladies they admired.  Eventually, Xylouris managed to approach Ourania at a chance encounter and propose to her, and the pair eloped heading for Anogeia where the wedding would occur.  Due to the lack of prior consent on her family's side, and although her father did assent to the marriage and did sign off on it, thus averting the potential for a blood feud (aka Cretan Vendetta) between the two families, Ourania was ostracized by her family for the perceived insult of the elopement, and by her own account, that would create a lifelong psychological wound in her which the extremely warm reception she was given at Anogeia could scarcely compensate for.  Eventually, Ourania and her family managed to reconcile, after her husband's career took off and his livelihood was secured.  The couple had two children, a son named Giorgis (George; Greek: Γεώργιος / Γιώργης) after his paternal grandfather and a daughter named Rinio (Irene; Greek: Ειρήνη / Ρηνιώ) after her maternal grandmother, and remained happily married until Xylouris' untimely passing.  As rural custom ordains, Ourania has maintained her mourning (Greek: πένθος) ever since, and never remarried.  The love story of the couple is often recounted in Greek Media and it echoes in part the great Cretan poetic (epic-lyric) work Erotokritos by Vitsentzos Kornaros, an all-time Cretan folk classic, select verses of which were sung by Xylouris in one of his best-known albums, a namesake of the literary work itself.

Illness and death
Nikos Xylouris succumbed to lung cancer and metastasis to the brain after a long battle on 8 February 1980, in Piraeus, Greece. He was interred at the First Cemetery of Athens.

Discography
 Mia mavrofora otan perna — Μια μαυροφόρα όταν περνά (1958)
 Anyfantou — Ανυφαντού (1969)
 O Psaronikos — Ο Ψαρονίκος (1970)
 Mantinades kai Chorοi — Μαντινάδες και χοροί (1970)
 Chroniko — Χρονικό (1970)
 Rizitika — Ριζίτικα (1971)
 Dialeimma — Διάλειμμα (1972)
 Ithageneia — Ιθαγένεια (1972)
 Dionyse kalokairi mas — Διόνυσε καλοκαίρι μας (1972)
 O Tropikos tis Parthenou — Ο Τροπικός της Παρθένου (1973)
 O Xylouris tragouda yia tin Kriti — Ο Ξυλούρης τραγουδά για την Κρήτη (1973)
 O Stratis Thalassinos anamesa stous Agapanthous — Ο Στρατής Θαλασσινός ανάμεσα στους Αγάπανθους (1973)
 Perifani ratsa — Περήφανη ράτσα (1973)
 Akolouthia — Ακολουθία (1974)
 To megalo mas tsirko — Το μεγάλο μας τσίρκο (1974)
 Parastaseis — Παραστάσεις (1975)
 Anexartita — Ανεξάρτητα (1975)
 Komentia, i pali chorikon kai vasiliadon — Κομέντια, η πάλη χωρικών και βασιλιάδων (1975)
 Kapnismeno tsoukali — Καπνισμένο τσουκάλι (1975)
 Ta pou thymoumai tragoudo — Τα που θυμούμαι τραγουδώ (1975)
 Kyklos Seferi — Κύκλος Σεφέρη (1976)
 Erotokritos — Ερωτόκριτος (1976)
 I symfonia tis Gialtas kai tis pikris agapis — Η συμφωνία της Γιάλτας και της πικρής αγάπης (1976)
 I eleftheri poliorkimeni — Οι ελεύθεροι πολιορκημένοι (1977)
 Ta erotika — Τα ερωτικά (1977)
 Ta Xyloureika — Τα Ξυλουρέικα (1978)
 Ta antipolemika — Τα αντιπολεμικά (1978)
 Salpisma — Σάλπισμα (1978)
 14 Chryses Epitichies – 14 Χρυσές Επιτυχίες (1978)

Posthumously released material
 Teleftaia ora Kriti — Τελευταία ώρα Κρήτη (1981)
 Nikos Xylouris — Νίκος Ξυλούρης (1982)
 Pantermi Kriti — Πάντερμη Κρήτη (1983)
 O Deipnos o Mystikos — Ο Δείπνος ο Μυστικός (1984)
 Stavros Xarchakos: Theatrika — Σταύρος Ξαρχάκος: Θεατρικά (1985)
 O Yiannis Markopoulos ston Elliniko Kinematografo — Ο Γιάννης Μαρκόπουλος στον Ελληνικό Κινηματογράφο (1988)
 I synavlia sto Irodio 1976 (1990) — Η συναυλία στο Ηρώδειο 1976 (1990)
 To chroniko tou Nikou Xylouri — Το χρονικό του Νίκου Ξυλούρη (1996)
 Nikos Xylouris — Νίκος Ξυλούρης (2000)
 I psychi tis Kritis — Η ψυχή της Κρήτης (2002)
 Itane mia fora... — Ήτανε μια φορά... (2005)
 Tou Chronou Ta Girismata — Του Χρόνου Τα Γυρίσματα (2005)
 Itane Mia Fora... Kai Emeine Gia Panta! — Ήτανε Μια Φορά... Και Έμεινε Για Πάντα! (2017)

See also
 Music of Crete

References

External links
 Documentary traces the musical legacy of the great Nikos Xylouris
 Thirty Two Years After the Death Of Cretan Singer Nikos Xylouris
 Nikos Xilouris (Νίκος Ξυλούρης) — The Archangel of Crete
 Nikos Xilouris on YouTube
 Happy Birthday Filedem! Born 100 Years Ago Today

1936 births
1980 deaths
20th-century composers
20th-century Greek male singers
Burials at the First Cemetery of Athens
Cretan musicians
Greek songwriters
Greek folk singers
Singers from Crete
People from Anogeia
Deaths from lung cancer in Greece
Deaths from brain cancer in Greece